The following lists events that happened during 1999 in the Democratic Republic of the Congo.

Incumbents 
 President: Laurent-Désiré Kabila

Events

January
 January 6 - DRC rebel leaders are alleged to have investigated a massacre of up to 500 civilians, many of them women and children, over the New Year.
 January 7 - Zimbabwe says its military intervention in DRC is being funded by France, Libya and Angola.
 January 13 - Nuns report that teenager soldiers of DRC have carried out a massacre of more than 200 people in the town of Libenge.

March
 March 1 - Sudan enters the Second Congo War.
 March 12 - The United Kingdom recalls its ambassador to DRC due to the deportation of five Britons accused of spying.

April
 April 20 - Uganda downplays an agreement in Libya to end the Second Congo War.
 April 21 - Rwanda rejects the peace agreement in Libya to end the Second Congo War.

May
 May 28 - Rwanda declares a ceasefire in the Democratic Republic of the Congo.

References

 
1990s in the Democratic Republic of the Congo
Years of the 20th century in the Democratic Republic of the Congo
Democratic Republic of the Congo
Democratic Republic of the Congo